Walter Baumgartner (1904–1997) was a Swiss film composer. He scored over ninety films, working in his later years with the producer-director Erwin C. Dietrich. His nephew was the cinematographer Peter Baumgartner. He was married to the German actress Helen Vita from 1956 until his death.

Selected filmography
 Palace Hotel (1952)
 The Strangler of the Tower (1966)
 Bed Hostesses (1973)
 Frauengefängnis (1975)
 Love Letters of a Portuguese Nun (1977)
 Ilsa, the Wicked Warden (1977)
 Women in Cellblock 9 (1977)
 Sechs Schwedinnen im Pensionat (1979)
 High Test Girls (1980)

References

Bibliography 
 Peter Cowie & Derek Elley. World Filmography: 1967. Fairleigh Dickinson University Press, 1977.

External links 
 

1904 births
1997 deaths
People from the canton of St. Gallen
Swiss film score composers